The Long Home is an unreleased American indie drama film directed by and starring James Franco, based on the 1999 novel of the same name by William Gay. It also stars Josh Hutcherson, Tim Blake Nelson, Courtney Love, Timothy Hutton, Giancarlo Esposito, Ashton Kutcher, Josh Hartnett, Zoe Levin, Lio Tipton, Scott Haze, and Robin Lord Taylor. Principal photography began on May 1, 2015.

Plot
Dallas Hardin, a corrupt businessman and bootlegger who dominates his small Tennessee town, murders honest workingman Nathan Winer in 1932. In the 1950s, Nathan Winer Jr., the dead man's son, is unaware of Hardin's role in his father's death and works as a carpenter for Hardin. Nathan Jr. is in love with Amber Rose, a young local girl whom Hardin employs as an escort. Elderly local recluse William Tell Oliver has evidence to prove Hardin is a murderer. Eerie events hint at a supernatural justice working its way out.

Cast
Josh Hutcherson as Nathan Winer Jr.
Zoe Levin as Amber Rose
Tim Blake Nelson as Hovington
James Franco as Dallas Hardin
Courtney Love as Pearl
Timothy Hutton
Giancarlo Esposito as William Tell Oliver
Ashton Kutcher as Nathan Winer Sr.
Robin Lord Taylor as Lipscomb
Josh Hartnett
Lio Tipton 
Scott Haze as Weimer
Gabrielle Haugh as Grace Blalock
Leila George as Edna Hodges
Austin Stowell
Garret Dillahunt as Bellwether
Beth Grant as Mrs. Winer

Production

Pre-production
James Franco would direct, produce (through Rabbit Bandini Productions), and star in the film adaption of the William Gay novel of the same name. Robert Halmi Jr. and Jim Reeve would be executive producers.

The Long Home was offered up to $288,355 in Ohio film tax credits.

Casting
Franco posted on Instagram a list of The Long Home cast which included Josh Hutcherson, Timothy Hutton, Keegan Allen, Ashley Greene, Tim Blake Nelson, Jim Parrack, and Scott Haze.

Tim Blake Nelson collaborated with Franco for the seventh time as Hovington, a bootlegging patriarch. Josh Hutcherson starred as Nathan Winer. Hutton and Courtney Love were cast. Giancarlo Esposito played William Tell Oliver, "a Southern salt-of-the-earth man with a colorful, checkered life spent entirely within the confines of the country". Several other actors signed on to the cast: Ashton Kutcher, Josh Hartnett, Zoe Levin (as Amber Rose), Lio Tipton, Haze, and Robin Lord Taylor.

Filming
The film was shot in Eaton, Ohio, Hamilton, Ohio, and Cincinnati, Ohio.

Principal photography began on May 1, 2015 in Hamilton. This coincided with filming of another Franco film, Goat, which was shot "pretty much simultaneously". Filming began in Eaton on May 17. Production on the film wrapped on May 23, 2015, with filming lasting 23 days.

Release
The Long Home was tentatively expected to be released in 2017, and in November of that year, the sales rights to the movie were acquired by Great Point Media. However, it has yet to be released in any format as of 2022.

References

External links

English-language films
Films set in the 1940s
Films shot in Ohio
Films set in Tennessee
Films based on American novels
Films directed by James Franco
American drama films
Unreleased American films